Thomas Thorninger (born 20 October 1972) is a Danish former football player. He played for PSV Eindhoven in the Netherlands, Italian clubs Perugia Calcio and Udinese Calcio, as well as Vejle Boldklub, AGF Aarhus and F.C. Copenhagen in Denmark. He played three games and scored two goals for the Denmark national under-21 football team.

Honours
AGF Aarhus :
Danish Cup 1996
Danish Superliga topscorer 1995–96
FC København :
Danish championship 2000–01

External links
Danish national team profile
 Official Danish Superliga Stats
 Vejle Boldklub profile
 F.C. Copenhagen profile
 Danish Cup Final 1995/1996

1972 births
Living people
Danish men's footballers
Denmark under-21 international footballers
PSV Eindhoven players
A.C. Perugia Calcio players
Udinese Calcio players
Vejle Boldklub players
Aarhus Gymnastikforening players
F.C. Copenhagen players
Danish Superliga players
Serie A players
Serie B players
Eredivisie players
Danish expatriate men's footballers
Expatriate footballers in Italy
Expatriate footballers in the Netherlands
Association football forwards